Azim Gheychisaz is an Iranian mountain climber and the summiter of all 14 Eight-thousanders. Marble Wall  peak in  Kazakhstan was his first professional climbing  in 2000. He is a member of Iranian national mountaineering team. By 2017, he has successfully ascended all 14 peaks over 8,000 m, becoming the first Iranian to do so and joining the 8000 club.

Life
He was born on 1981 in Tabriz, Iran. He graduated from technical high school with a degree in machinery. He is student of Physical Education at University of Tabriz

Successful ascents
Azim's successful ascents include following peaks 
 2002- Marble Wall Peak (6400 m)
 2003- Gasherbrum I (up to 7800m)
 2004- Diran Peak (up to 5500m)
 2004- Spantik
 2005- Everest (with supplementary oxygen)
 2005- Ararat
 2006- Noshaq
 2008- Broad Peak
 2009- Pobeda Peak
 2010- Dhaulagiri, the first Iranian ascent
 2010- Nanga Parbat, the first Iranian ascent
 2011- Kangchenjunga, the first Iranian ascent
 2011- Gasherbrum II
 2011- Gasherbrum I
 2012- Annapurna, the first Iranian ascent
 2012- K2
 2012- Manaslu 
 2013- Makalu, the first Iranian ascent
 2013- Cho Oyu, the first Iranian ascent
 2014- Shishapangma, the first Iranian ascent
 2016- Everest (2nd ascent, without supplementary oxygen)
 2017- Lhotse

References

Sportspeople from Tabriz
Iranian mountain climbers
Summiters of all 14 eight-thousanders
1981 births
Living people
University of Tabriz alumni
Mount Ararat